Kadungon or Kadunkon was also the name an earlier Pandya king, mentioned in the Sangam literature.

Kadungon was a Pandya king who revived the Pandya rule in South India in the 6th century CE. Along with the Pallava king Simhavishnu, he is credited with ending the Kalabhra rule, marking the beginning of a new era in the Tamil speaking region. 

Kadungon's title was "Pandyadhiraja", and his capital was Madurai. He was succeeded by his son Maravarman Avanisulamani.

Dates 
Most historians, including R. C. Majumdar, state the period of Kadungon rule as 590–620 CE.

 K. A. Nilakanta Sastri (the first assumption) — c. 600–620 CE
 K. A. Nilakanta Sastri (revised date) — c. 590–620 CE
 Noboru Karashima — c. 560–90 CE (or) c. 590–620 CE

Velvikudi Grant 
The Sangam literature mentions the early Pandya dynasty, which is believed to have gone into obscurity during the Kalabhra interregnum. The last known king of this dynasty was Ugrapperuvaludi.

Kadungon is the next known Pandyan king. Not much information is available about him. Most of the knowledge about him comes from the Velvikudi inscription of the Pandya king Parantaka Nedunchadaiyan (also Nedunjadaiyan or Nedunchezhiyan). According to this inscription, Kadungon defeated several petty chieftains and destroyed "the bright cities of unbending foes". It describes him as the one who liberated the Pandya country from the Kalabhras and emerged as a "resplendent sun from the dark clouds of the Kalabhras". His defeat of Kalabhras (who were probably Jains or Buddhists) was hailed as the triumph of Shaivism.

References

Bibliography 

 
 
 
 

Pandyan kings
6th-century Indian monarchs